Klanec pri Kozini is a settlement south of Kozina in the Municipality of Hrpelje-Kozina in the Littoral region of Slovenia.

Name
The name of the settlement was changed from Klanec to Klanec pri Kozini in 1953.

Church
The parish church in the settlement is dedicated to Saint Peter and belongs to the Koper Diocese.

References

External links
Klanec pri Kozini on Geopedia

Populated places in the Municipality of Hrpelje-Kozina